Tincalconite is a hydrous sodium borate mineral closely related to borax, and is a secondary mineral that forms as a dehydration product of borax. Its formula is Na2B4O7·5H2O or Na2[B4O5(OH)4]·3H2O.

Tincalconite typically occurs as a fine grained white powder. It crystallizes in the hexagonal crystal system and has been found as primary euhedral di-rhombohedral, pseudo-octahedral crystals. It is also found pseudomorphically replacing borax crystals. It has a specific gravity of 1.88 and a Mohs hardness of 2. Refractive index values are nω=1.460 and nε=1.470.

While most tincalconite is created by man through exposing borax to dry air, there are natural occurrences of tincalconite, as in Searles Lake, California where it was first described in 1878. In addition to several California and Nevada locations it is reported from Argentina, Italy, Turkey and Ukraine.

The name comes from  "tincal", Sanskrit for borax, and Greek, "konis", meaning powder, for its composition and typical powdery nature.

Gallery

References 

 Palache, C., H. Berman, and C. Frondel (1951) Dana’s system of Mineralogy, (7th edition), v. II, pp. 337–339.
 Mineral Data Publishing, PDF
 Mindat with location data
 Webmineral data
 Mineral Galleries

Sodium minerals
Nesoborates
Trigonal minerals
Minerals in space group 155

et:Booraks
pl:Tetraboran sodu
ru:Тетраборат натрия